Reach Out Worldwide is a 501(c)(3) registered nonprofit founded in 2010 by Paul Walker that helps bring first responders to disaster areas to augment local relief efforts. Their teams typically consist of medical technicians, doctors, nurses, paramedics, firefighters, and construction workers. The group's goal is to air-drop into disaster zones the minute the news hits the wires.  Paul Walker's brother, Cody Walker, is the current Chief Executive Officer of Reach Out Worldwide.

Paul Walker organized a relief team in response to the 2010 Haiti earthquake, and, following their return, he founded Reach Out Worldwide to help fill the gap between available resources and the requirement for personnel in post-disaster situations. Reach Out Worldwide's work is mainly the result of volunteers that focus on quick deployments to areas that are small or remote and are often the first assistance a town or village sees. Domestically, they assist with clean up efforts ranging from mucking and gutting flood damaged homes, clearing access ways, and taking down damaged trees. Internationally, Reach Out Worldwide sends teams of medical and EMS professionals to provide medical aid and distribute supplies.

Missions 
Reach Out Worldwide has provided support in the following disasters:

April 2015 Nepal Earthquake 
This was the first mission led by Cody Walker following the death of Paul Walker. The nine-member mobile disaster medical team consisted of one doctor and several local firefighter-paramedics, including one from the Orange County Fire Authority and three from the Pasadena Fire Department. Reach Out Worldwide treated 400 cases in 96 hours in rural villages cut off from supplies due to dangerous roads.

Game4Paul 
Reach Out Worldwide held the charity event Game4Paul on May 9, 2015, raising over $100,000 in fundraising. This event has subsequently been held in September 2016 raising over $130,000, October 2017, and October 2018. In 2017, Microsoft released a limited edition Xbox One to raffle with all proceeds going to Reach Out Worldwide. In 2018 Microsoft partnered with Reach Out Worldwide for Game4Paul again.

References

External links 

 Official website

Non-profit organizations based in the United States